Cables Fables is an album by jazz pianist George Cables and his trio, released in 1991 on SteepleChase Records.

Track listing
"In Walked Bud" (Monk) – 6:28
"Lullaby" (Cables) – 5:51
"Waltz for Debby" (Evans, Lees) – 8:39 Erroneously titled "Waltz for Debbie" on the cover
"Helen's Song" (Cables) – 6:34
"Over the Rainbow" (Arlen, Harburg) – 12:05
"Just Friends" (Klenner, Lewis) – 5:48
"Con Alma" (Gillespie) – 8:17
"Sweet Rita Suite" (Cables) – 6:33
"All the Things You Are" (Hammerstein, Kern) – 6:18

Personnel
George Cables – piano
Peter Washington – bass
Kenny Washington – drums

References

George Cables albums
1991 albums
SteepleChase Records albums